Mediavia is a genus of snout moths erected by Maria Alma Solis in 1993.

Species
Original genus follows the author citation:

 Mediavia aciusa  (Macalla)
 Mediavia agnesa  (Tetralopha)
 Mediavia bevnoa  (Stericta)
 Mediavia discalis  (Jocara)
 Mediavia dissimilis  (Roeseliodes)
 Mediavia eadberti  (Stericta)
 Mediavia emerantia  (Stericta)
 Mediavia glaucinalis  (Stericta)
 Synonym: M. paschasia  (Stericta)
 Mediavia grenvilalis  (Jocara)
 Mediavia hermengilda  (Stericta)
 Mediavia ildefonsa  (Stericta)
 Mediavia internigralis  (Pococera)
 Mediavia longistriga  (Jocara)
 Synonym: M. comgalla  (Stericta)
 Mediavia phaebadia  (Stericta)
 Mediavia vimina  (Jocara)

References

Epipaschiinae
Pyralidae genera